Bardera is a city in Jubaland State of Somalia. It is the second largest and most populous city in Jubaland with Kismayo being the largest and most densely populated city in the region. Bardera sits on the Jubba River around 250 km west of the city of Baidoa and is in a highland area with fertile soil. The city experiences extremely hot temperatures from December to April and heavy rainfalls from April to May knowns as Gu (spring) The city was formerly known as the "Onion capital of the World" for its production of the vegetable, the name Bardera means tall palm trees. The palms were cut to construct native homes or midille.

Bardhere is also known as the centre of Islamic scholarship, as it is for agricultural production. The climate is ideally suited for year-round crop production and boasts of farms of sorghum, corn, onions, beans, sesame plants, tobacco, and fruits such as bananas, watermelon, oranges, papayas, and mangoes.

Etymology 
Bardera is an important agricultural centre living up to its name Bar meaning “palm tree”, and Dhere meaning “tall” a reference to the ubiquitous palm trees that have grown expansively in the area.

The river banks are lined by beautiful palm trees and so are the farms of this town that lies at an intersection of all major roads that links Somalia to Elwak and Mandera in Kenya, Kismayo, Baidoa, Barawe and Dinsoor within Somalia.

History

Medieval
During the Middle Ages, Bardera and its surrounding area was part of the Ajuran Empire that governed much of southern Somalia and eastern Ethiopia, with its domain extending from Hobyo in the north, to Qelafo in the west, to Kismayo in the south. Bardera was one of the most important cities in the Jubba river during the Ajuran period. It was an agricultural and commercial center. It had roads that connected the Benadir ports built by Ajuran. Bardhere provided many goods to the coastal provinces and many merchants across the region came to Bardera for trade.

Early Modern

Bardera continued its agricultural and commercial legacy under Geledi Sultanate rule where it was surrounded by a citadel and with increased link between the coast and interior, both the Benadir ports and Bardera flourished with the city serving as the key ivory hub in the southern part of the Horn.

In the 1830s, a new militant extremist group rose in the citadel of Bardera, overlooking the Jubba River, and began imposing their interpretation of Islam on the surrounding regions, including the coastal city of Barawa, which they subdued and captured in 1840. In response, Sultan Yusuf Mahamud gathered his armies into a coalition and marched towards Bardera. The citadel was besieged and then burned to the ground, solidifying Sultan Yusuf's paramount authority in southern Somalia following his Conquest of Bardera.
Following the defeat of the Bardera recovered and remained relatively quiet until the eventual end of the Geledi Sultanate and subsequent incorporation into Italian Somaliland.

Modern
After independence in 1960, the city was made the center of the official Bardera District. Bardera became the first place in Somalia were onions were grown commercially. This production began to increase rapidly but eventually fell off in the 1980s due to failed agricultural policies of the Somali government. The actual quality soil is in a narrow strip on either side of the river where pumps can feed private farms. Other produce such as sorghum can be found in Markabley/Hayranta although still in the district. German Explorer Carl Von Der Decken was killed at this same site in 1860, remnants of his wrecked ship still remain.

Economy

The economy of Bardera is largely agriculture-based. Animal husbandry also figures prominently, with livestock kept for meat, milk and butter.

Agriculture

There are two types of farming which exist in Bardera area: Irrigated farming and seasonal farming.

Many medium- and small-scale farms near the river use water pumping machines. These motors irrigate the land with canals, and farmers plant crops.

The majority of farmers use a low-tech farming method of farming during the two rainy seasons . Small operation farms are found throughout Jubaland, far away from the river banks where families plant sorghum, maize, and beans on any land that is suitable for farming.

Mogadishu's fruit and vegetable market used to have a section containing Bardera's famous onion product. Since the start of the civil war in Somalia, produce from Bardera to large urban centers like Mogadishu, Kismayo, or Baidoa were diverted to Kenyan markets such as Wajir, Garissa, Mombasa, and Nairobi.

There are many beautiful palm trees along the river bank and almost every farm has one or two palm trees.

Large numbers of Bardera's residents make their living working in the many small and large farms on the span of the Jubba River in Bardera District

Sorghum, corn or maize, different types of onions, beans, sesame, tobacco, and fruits such as bananas, watermelon, oranges, papayas, and mangoes, from Bardera farms reach markets as far as Djibouti, about 3,000 km away to the north of Somalia.

Education 
Bardera for ages was a center of higher learning, The city is famously associated with the study of Islamic jurisprudence.

Bardera's Islamic centers attracted students seeking knowledge and teachers seeking employment used to come from across Somalia. Bardera has 20 elementary schools, seventeen primary and secondary schools. Bardera polytechnic college was founded in July 2008. This college was established to cover the higher education needs of the Bardera area community, which has been growing since the start of the 1990s. Bardera polytechnic college s policy is give vocational training, real marketable skills for 16 to 60 age population.

Juba Valley Agricultural Institute is an academic institute within the Bardera Polytechnic College in Bardera, Somalia. It is situated within the southern Jubaland.

Juba Valley Veterinary Institute is a veterinary institute in Bardera, Somalia. The institute is part of Bardera Polytechnic specialized schools and institutes within the college system.

Both Juba Valley Agricultural Institute and Jubba Valley Veterinary institute were part of the second phase of development at Bardera Polytechnic.

For centuries, students traveled from far distances and from all points on the Horn as a whole. Every Somali who came of age before the 1950s, knows the importance of Bardera as a religious education center.

Later generations found different kind of class spaces at Somali National University (SNU), Lafole, Lafole Agricultural College and Sidam management training school.

Geography 
Bardera is situated 2-3 degrees latitude north of the equator and at a longitude of 42-43 degrees. It is characterized by warm weather and high humidity.

Climate

Photos

Notable People 
Abdiweli Sheikh Ahmed, Former Prime minister of Somalia.

Farah Hussein Sharmarke, Philosopher, Poet.

Fatimo Isaak Bihi, First Somali female ambassador, Ambassador to Geneva, Director of the African Department of the Ministry of Foreign Affairs.

Abdi Farah Shirdon, Former Prime Minister of Somalia

Aden Ibrahim Aw Hirsi, Author, Somali Politician.

Ahmed Warsame, Head of the Somali Military Academy.

Abdulahi Sheik Ismael Fara-Tag, Former Head of Jubba valley alliance, Member of sen of upper house in Somalia, Former Vice President Of Jubaland State of Somalia.

Mohamud Ali Magan, Somali Foreign Affairs, Consul General to United States Of America and Canada.

Ali shire Warsame, Somali Politician

References

External links

 Bardhere city portal 

Populated places in Gedo
Jubba River